The Elovaters are a Boston-based American reggae rock band that formed in 2014.

History

Formation and The Cornerstone (2014–2017)
Formed in 2014 in their hometown of Marshfield, Massachusetts, The Elovaters were formally The Cornerstone, a 7-piece reggae rock band rising on the Boston concert scene.

Under their new name, the Elovaters re-released their debut album now taking their former title The Cornerstone. It was officially released on January 20, 2017 and was recorded, mixed, and mastered by Mike Caplan at the legendary Lion and Fox Studios in Washington, D.C.

Defy Gravity (2018–2019)
Their sophomore album, Defy Gravity released on October 26, 2018 through Rootfire Cooperative and was produced by Danny Kalb. It debuted #1 on Billboards Reggae chart and iTunes Reggae chart. It was also voted people's choice "Album of the Year" by Surf Roots TV & Radio.

Rootfire defined their music as "warm weather reggae out of one of the coldest places in the country." The band is currently represented by Madison House Agency.

Their song "Boston" was played during the Boston Red Sox World Series parade. And "People Go" was featured on CBS's Hawaii Five-0. Both songs are from their Defy Gravity album.

Double Vision EP (2020)
The Elovaters released their Double Vision EP on May 29, 2020; their second collaboration with producer Danny Kalb. The 5-song EP features Brett Bollinger of Pepper, Giant Panda Guerilla Dub Squad, Slightly Stoopid, among others. It was recorded at The Noise Floor in Dover, New Hampshire. The EP introduced their first single "Fast and Slow". In December 2020, Double Vision was also voted "EP of the Year" by online reggae news website, Reggae 360.

Live albums and Defy Dub
The band released an acoustic live album titled Live @ Sugarshack Sessions on November 16, 2019. And a dub album, Defy Dub on August 28, 2020.

They also released a live stream and digital album Live From The Felton Music Hall on October 25, 2020. It featured an hour and a half live performance of songs from their previous albums and EP at the Felton Music Hall in Felton, California.

The Elovaters was featured as one of many reggae bands on Collie Buddz riddim album, Cali Roots Riddim 2020 with their single, "Sensimilla", which was produced by Collie Buddz and mixed by Stick Figure's touring guitarist, producer Johnny Cosmic.

In January 2021, The Elovaters was one of several reggae and punk bands on The House That Bradley Built, a charity compilation honoring Sublime's lead singer Bradley Nowell, helping musicians with substance abuse. They covered Sublime's song "Get Ready" on the Deluxe Edition.

Castles (2021)
The Elovaters released their third full-length album, Castles on August 13, 2021 on their own imprint Belly Full Records. It was produced by Johnny Cosmic and recorded at Stick Figure's Great Stone Studios in Oakland, California in only 16 days Jackson Wetherbee said [it's the] "most eclectic album we've ever done. I've brought in more singer/songwriter stuff. We weren't trying to be overly reggae on this album." Starting in March, they released singles from the upcoming album which features reggae artists The Movement, Brother Ali, G. Love & Special Sauce, Keznamdi, Stick Figure, Luke Mitrani, and St. Maarten reggae group, Orange Grove.

Awards and honors
In 2018, The Elovaters won the annual Surf Roots TV & Radio fans-choice "Album of the Year" with their Defy Gravity album.

In August 2021, The Elovaters were entered into the New England Music Awards. They were nominated for three categories: "Act of the Year", "Live Act of the Year", and "Roots Act of the Year". The winners were announced on October 18, and The Elovaters won "Roots Act of the Year".

On December 26, 2021, The Elovaters won the most votes by Facebook, Instagram and Twitter users for the "2021 Album of the Year" by Surf Roots TV & Radio for their album Castles. This is the band's second time winning with the reggae rock streaming TV channel for Amazon Fire TV, Apple TV, and Roku, making them the first two-time winners.

The Elovaters were once again entered into the New England Music Awards for 2022. This time, they were nominated for four categories: "Artist of the Year", "Live Act of the Year", "Album of the Year" for Castles, and "Song of the Year" with "Margaritas". The winners were announced on November 13 during the award show at Six String Grill and Stage in Foxborough, MA. The band won "Artist Of The Year" and "Live Act of The Year".

The Elovaters were awarded "Best Reggae/Ska Artist” of the year at the 2022 Boston Music Awards.

Tours
Over the years, The Elovaters have been an opening act for Pepper, Ziggy Marley, Easy Star All-Stars, The Movement, and Stick Figure. They have played in festivals such as the Sierra Nevada World Music Festival, Reggae Rise Up (both Florida and Utah), Levitate Music Festival, and One Love Cali Reggae Festival, and the California Roots Music and Arts Festival.

On September 11, 2021, The Elovaters was one of the headliners that opened for Slightly Stoopid, along with special performances by Stephen Marley, and Don Carlos & The Dub Vision Band at Petco Park, home of the San Diego Padres in San Diego, California.

Other Projects
The Elovaters collaborated with Vitamin Sea Brewing, LLC in their homestate Weymouth, Massachusetts on an IPA called "Criminal" (7%) after their single. The brewery describes it as, "smooth and full of soul, this one is packed with Juicy Simcoe and Sabro hops". They also have a special merchandise collection with the company, featuring the band's 'smoking bear' logo on beach towels, bags, and drink containers.

In November 2022, The Elovater's collaborated with Wine Boss to make a special reserve Cabernet Sauvignon that is named after the band's hit single, "Criminal". Inspired by Jackson Wetherbee's choice of wine that "paired well with the positive energy and the 'Getaway' feels of their music", it has notes of red fruit and hints of oak, vanilla and a touch of bell pepper. In February 2023, The Elovaters announced that "Criminal Cabernet" won a gold medal in the 2023 WineJudging.com wine tasting competition. There were over sixty judges at the event, representing various North American wine regions, evaluating 5,500 wines from nearly 1,000 wineries.

Band members

Current members:
Jackson Wetherbee – lead vocals, rhythm guitar (2014–present)
John Alves – lead guitar  (2014–present)
Matt Link – bass (2018–present)
Nick Asta – drums (2014–present)
Derrick Cabral – percussion (2014–present)
Greg Nectow – keyboard (2017–present)

Past members:
Nick Frenay – trumpet, saxophone (2014–2017)
Myles Sweeney – keyboard (2014–2017)
Mark King - bass (2014–2016)

Discography

Studio albums

EPs/Live/Dub albums

Singles

References

External links

Musical groups from Boston
American reggae musical groups